Johnny Cash Remixed is a tribute album to country musician, Johnny Cash featuring remixes of Johnny Cash's songs by  various artists, such as The Heavy and Alabama 3.  It was released by Compadre Records on January 27, 2009. On the second disc of the album is a documentary of the CD's production.

Track list

Chart performance

References

Reviews
Pitchfork
Blog Critics
Rolling Stone
Pop Matters

2009 remix albums
Johnny Cash tribute albums